Control operator may refer to:

 Operator (profession)
 Operators in control flow software programming

See also
 Control (disambiguation)
 Operator (disambiguation)